Leslie Louise Bibb (born November 17, 1974) is an American actress and model. Bibb first appeared on television in 1996 with minor roles in a few series, and on film in 1997 with a small role in Private Parts. Her first recurring TV role was in The Big Easy (1997). For her role as Brooke McQueen on the WB Network dramedy series Popular, she received a Teen Choice Award for Television Choice Actress. She has appeared in the Marvel Cinematic Universe as Christine Everhart in Iron Man (2008), Iron Man 2 (2010), What If...? (2021), and several viral marketing campaigns in which the character hosts WHIH Newsfront. She appears as Grace Sampson/ Lady Liberty in the Netflix series Jupiter's Legacy (2021).

Early life
Bibb was born in Bismarck, North Dakota, and raised in Lovingston in Nelson County, Virginia. Her father died three years after she was born. Bibb subsequently moved to Richmond, Virginia, with her mother and three older sisters, where she attended the all-girls Catholic private school Saint Gertrude High School.

Career

Modeling
In 1990, when Bibb was sixteen years old, The Oprah Winfrey Show and the Elite Agency held a nationwide modeling search. The celebrity judgesJohn Casablancas, Naomi Campbell, Linda Evangelista, and Imanchose Bibb as the winner.

After finishing her junior year, Bibb flew to New York City to sign a contract with Elite Agency and modeled over that summer and went on a trip to Japan. Bibb returned to the United States for her senior year and graduated in 1991.

Throughout her modeling career, Bibb has appeared on the cover of several magazines, including CosmoGirl, 944, Seventeen, Gear, Paper, L'Officiel, Teen, FHM, Stuff, YM and Fit. She was featured on the 2001 FHM calendar and on the Maxim Uncut 2001 15-Month calendar. In 2008, Bibb appeared in a television commercial for Almay Pure Blends.

Acting

Bibb first appeared on television in 1996, playing in episodes of Pacific Blue and Home Improvement. Her first film role came in the comedy Private Parts. This was followed by her first television series, where she replaced the departed Susan Walters as the female lead in the second season of The Big Easy. Most critics panned the show, and it was canceled months later after low ratings. She appeared in the romantic drama Touch Me (1997) and had a supporting role in the film This Space Between Us (1999). In 1999, Bibb had her big break appearing as a lead character on the WB Network television series Popular. Her role was Brooke McQueen, the most popular girl at Kennedy High School who is beautiful, a straight-A student, and a cheerleader. The show was a major success among teenagers and led Bibb to more recognizable film roles. The show garnered her a Teen Choice Award for Television Choice Actress and a Young Hollywood Award nomination for Exciting New Face – Female. During the series, she filmed the psychological thriller The Skulls (1999), as the classmate, friend and love interest of one of the main characters. The Skulls received a negative reception from critics but was a box-office success. She received a role in the 2001 comedy See Spot Run, playing a single mother who spends most of the film on her own Planes, Trains and Automobiles–style adventure.

Bibb was cast in a recurring role on the series ER and played the lead character on the television series Line of Fire. Bibb joined the cast of Crossing Jordan as Detective Lu Simmons until Season 6. She appeared as Desiree in the independent film Wristcutters: A Love Story (2006). Wristcutters revolved around two characters who fall in love in purgatory after committing suicide. The film was nominated for the Sundance Film Festival's Grand Jury Prize, two Independent Spirit Awards and the Humanitas Prize. That year, she played Will Ferrell's character's wife Carley in the comedy feature film Talladega Nights: The Ballad of Ricky Bobby. Recalling acting with Ferrell during an interview with TV Guide, she said he was "just funny. And he has no qualms about making something funnier for you, even at his expense."

Bibb also starred in the sitcom Atlanta as Jessica. She was cast as Dr. Miranda Storm in Sex and Death 101, a black comedy, which was released direct-to-video in 2007. She appeared as a Vanity Fair reporter named Christine Everhart in the action film Iron Man (2008). In an interview, Bibb said about her character in the film: "she has a very strong sense of right and wrong, of good and evil, and I loved her passion." In 2008, Bibb starred as Maya Jones in the Ryuhei Kitamura–directed horror film The Midnight Meat Train (2008), based on Clive Barker's 1984 short story of the same name.

In the comedy Confessions of a Shopaholic (2009), she portrayed the rival of the main character. Confessions of a Shopaholic was panned by film critics but was a success at the box office. She had a pivotal recurring role on the NBC series Kings as Katrina Ghent and played Sarah Lowell in the thriller film Law Abiding Citizen (2009), which was released on October 16, 2009. The film was poorly received by critics.

In 2010, she reprised her role as Everhart in the sequel to Iron Man, Iron Man 2. The film is Bibb's biggest box-office success, with a worldwide gross of $621.8 million. Later in 2010, she starred in the independent comedy Miss Nobody, for which she also served as co-producer. For her performance, she won the Best Actress Award at the 26th Boston Film Festival. She was praised by critic Alissa Simon of Variety, who wrote "as she proved in Goran Dukic's Wristcutters: A Love Story, statuesque star Bibb is a smart actress willing to give herself totally to a role. As the sweetly goofy murderess, she takes pratfalls, suffers endless groping and sports unbecoming attire." Bibb also appeared in Kevin James' The Zookeeper, released in 2011. In 2012, Bibb starred as Amanda Vaughn on the ABC series GCB, which debuted on March 4, 2012, but the show was cancelled after 10 episodes. Bibb starred in the Neil LaBute play Reasons to be Happy, which premiered in June 2013 at MCC Theatre in New York.

In 2016, Bibb starred in the first season of YouTube Red original show Rhett & Link's Buddy System. She also appeared in an episode of the show's second season, which was released in 2017. She began recurring on ABC's American Housewife in 2016, playing the divorced next-door neighbor Viv. In 2017, Bibb starred in the Netflix comedy-horror film The Babysitter. She reprised her role in its 2020 sequel The Babysitter: Killer Queen. Also in 2017, she was cast as Susan Rollins in the comedy film Tag. In February 2019, it was announced that Bibb had been cast as Grace Sampson in the Netflix superhero series Jupiter's Legacy. In December 2020, She was cast in horror thriller The Inhabitant.

Bibb joined Netflix's workplace comedy series God's Favorite Idiot as Satan in March 2021. In September 2021, she was tapped to play Ellie in comedy film About My Father.

Other projects
Bibb is a supporter of Friends of El Faro, a grassroots non-profit organization that helps raise money for Casa Hogar Sion, an orphanage in Tijuana, Mexico.

In 2008, Revlon announced that its Almay brand has signed Bibb as its ambassador. She acts as a spokeswoman for Revlon's new and existing cosmetics collections. She has appeared in global multi-media campaigns.

In the fourth quarter of 2010, Bibb partnered with the non-profit LIFE Foundation by serving as the national spokesperson for Life Insurance Awareness Month.

She posed nude for the May 2012 issue of Allure magazine - alongside Maria Menounos, Debra Messing, Taraji P. Henson, and Morena Baccarin.

Personal life
Bibb married investment banker Rob Born on November 22, 2003, in Zihuatanejo, Mexico. They divorced on December 7, 2004.

She has been in a relationship with actor Sam Rockwell since 2007, when they reportedly met in Los Angeles as he was filming Frost/Nixon. They both appeared in Iron Man 2 and Don Verdean.

Filmography

Film

Television

Web

References

External links

1974 births
20th-century American actresses
21st-century American actresses
Actresses from North Dakota
American film actresses
American television actresses
Female models from North Dakota
Living people
People from Bismarck, North Dakota
People from Burleigh County, North Dakota
People from Nelson County, Virginia
University of Virginia alumni